Judson Laipply (born March 22, 1976) is an American internet celebrity from Bucyrus, Ohio. He served as the state president of The Ohio Association of Student Councils from 1993 to 1994. He is best known for his performance in the Evolution of Dance viral video clip, which became one of the most famous YouTube videos ever. He has worked as a public speaker since 2000.

"Evolution of Dance"
In 2003, Laipply originally performed "Evolution of Dance", at which time it consisted of 12 popular dance songs of the late 20th century. In the video, he is seen performing various dance moves on stage with a spot light pointing at him and sounds of audience cheering and clapping in the background. Four years later, he uploaded a video of the six-minute performance to YouTube. The clip received 70 million views in under 8 months. At that time, it was rated on YouTube as:
 #1 Most Viewed All Time Video on YouTube.com
 #1 Top Rated Video on YouTube.com
 #3 Most Discussed Video on YouTube.com

It has since been surpassed by other videos.

Songs in Evolution of Dance

Evolution of Dance 2
The Evolution of Dance 2 video, the sequel to the video sensation "Evolution of Dance" was released on December 17, 2008, as part of a national viral marketing campaign.

Evolution of Dance 3
This was announced by Judson on June 16, 2010. He stated that it was in its early stages and that it was too early to give any details. In a YouTube comment he claimed he was trying to incorporate much older music and possibly include a second dancer. It was uploaded in April 2016, to commemorate the 10th anniversary of Evolution of Dance.

Popular culture 
In December 2007, Judson appeared in an advert on the BBC for the 'dance season' during the Christmas Holidays. "Evolution of Dance" was #1 on the show Rude Tube hosted by Alex Zane and Laipply was interviewed on the show. Judson was also featured in the music video for Weezer's song "Pork and Beans" along with several other Internet celebrities.

In February 2010, the video was used as a question reference on the game show Jeopardy! in the 2010 college championships. In "The Delivery" episode of The Office, Andy Bernard does the dance sans music as a pregnancy distraction for Pam. In 2011, Judson also appeared on Tosh.0, hosted by Daniel Tosh. The video has been parodied numerous times on The Tonight Show with Jimmy Fallon through variations such as "Evolution of Mom Dancing" (guest-starring Michelle Obama) or "Evolution of Hip-Hop Dancing" (guest-starring Will Smith) among others.

He did another video, called "The Evolution of the Touchdown Dance", which included memorable NFL touchdown dances, like "The Ickey Shuffle", Joe Horn's cell phone celebration, and famous celebrations from Terrell Owens and Chad Ochocinco.

In December 2015, he appeared in YouTube's annual YouTube Rewind.

See also
 List of most-viewed YouTube videos

References

External links
 

American male dancers
Bluffton University alumni
Bowling Green State University alumni
Artists from Cleveland
Viral videos
1976 births
Living people
Place of birth missing (living people)
American YouTubers
People from Bucyrus, Ohio
Number-one YouTube channels in subscribers